The Belize Basketball Federation (BBF) is the governing body for basketball in Belize and a recognized member of FIBA. The BBF functions as a nonprofit organization that officially represents Belize in the sport of basketball. It consists of nine districts and school associations across Belize and manages all national teams. The league is affiliated with the Belize Olympic and Commonwealth Games Association and the National Sports Council of Belize.

Purpose
The Belize Basketball Federation was originally created as the Belize Amateur Basketball Association in 1927 to organize national junior and senior male and female competitions.
The purpose of the Federation is to assist and oversee the activities of local teams and organizations to ensure that the sport is conducted according to international basketball regulations and standards so that teams as well as individual players are able to effectively compete regionally and internationally. While the BBF has been in existence for some time, a new and vibrant executive was recently elected. It is their intention to increase the level of involvement by players and the general public in the hope that fun, discipline and competition of basketball can be a positive influence on Belizean youth.

The league's mission statement is "to grow and develop all aspects of basketball in Belize through collaboration, inclusion, proper organization and full accountability."

Executive committee members

2008–2012 members
 President: Paul Thompson
 Vice President: Broderick (Brads) Neal
 Vice President: Charles Ellis
 Secretary General: Julian Murillo
 Treasurer: Luigi Zaldivar

Other members
 Frank Lord
 Eugene (Jay) Jex
 Enid Dakers

Member organizations
 Corozal Basketball Association (CBA)
 Orange Walk District Basketball Association (OWDBA)
 Belize District Basketball Association
 Belmopan Basketball Association (BBA)
 San Ignacio and Santa Elena Basketball Association (SSBA)
 Dangriga Basketball Association (DBA)
 Association of Tertiary Level Institutions in Belize (ATLIB)
 National Secondary School Sports Association (NSSSA)
 Belize Association of Basketball Officials (BABO)

See also
Belize national basketball team

References

External links
Belize Basketball Federation
Belizean league on Latinbasket.com

Belize
Basketball
Basketball in Belize
1973 establishments in Belize